Xenobalistes is a genus of triggerfish found in the western central Pacific Ocean.

Species
There are currently 2 recognized species in this genus:
 Xenobalistes punctatus Heemstra & M. P. Smith, 1983 (Outtrigger triggerfish)
 Xenobalistes tumidipectoris Matsuura, 1981 (Wingkeel triggerfish)

References

Balistidae
Marine fish genera